Limet is a herbal bitters made in Karlovy Vary in the Czech Republic, flavored with anise seeds, cinnamon, various herbs, and a rich citrus flavor according to a recipe of the Becher family. It is normally served cold, and is often used as an aid to digestion.  It can also be served with a tonic water, in which case it is known as a "beton".  Its alcohol content is 38 percent (76 proof). The alcohol is based on the original Becherovka, similarly made from a secret mixture of different herbs.

The makers of Limet, the company Jan Becher — Karlovarská Becherovka, a.s., date back almost 200 years to the first decade of the 19th century. In 1807, Josef Becher, a pharmacist from Karlovy Vary, started selling bitters made to his own recipe as a medicinal tonic. In 1841, Josef Becher passed on his budding business to his son and heir Johann. Johann started large-scale production, and accordingly his name has been associated with Becherovka to the present day.

The list of ingredients required by the effective Czech Food Law are: water, spirit (30% vol.), sugar, mix of herbs and spices, natural aroma of citrus fruits, and colorant - caramel.

See also

 
 
 

Bitters
Czech brands
Czech cuisine
Czech distilled drinks